Language Testing is a quarterly peer-reviewed academic journal covering language testing and assessment. Its editors-in-chief are Luke Harding (Lancaster University) and Paula Winke (Michigan State University). It was established in 1984 and is published by SAGE Publications.

Abstracting and indexing
The journal is abstracted and indexed in:

According to the Journal Citation Reports, its 2019 impact factor is 1.154, ranking it 65th out of 184 journals in the category "Linguistics".

See also
List of applied linguistics journals

References

External links

SAGE Publishing academic journals
English-language journals
Publications established in 1984
Quarterly journals
Language education journals